The Norma M30 is an LMP3-spec sports prototype. The car is built by French constructor Norma Auto Concept and designed by company co-founder Norbert Santos. The Norma M30 won the 2017 Michelin Le Mans Cup in its debut year entered by DKR Engineering.

History

Development
The LMP3 class was launched by the Automobile Club de l'Ouest (ACO) in 2015. Five constructors were selected by the ACO to build chassis for the class. Besides Norma, ADESS, Ginetta, Ligier and Riley were selected. Ligier, ADESS and Ginetta launched their cars during the late 2015 and 2016 seasons. Norma launched their LMP3 prototype in February 2017. Nissan was appointed as the sole engine provider. The Nissan VK50VE engine produces 420hp. The engine was previously used in road going vehicles such as the Infiniti QX70. Romain Dumas tested the M30 at Nogaro and Pau Arnos.

Competition history
American driver Colin Thompson was the driver for the M30's racing debut. Thompson, racing with Kelly-Moss Road and Race, raced the car at Sebring International Raceway during the 12 Hours of Sebring weekend. After a troubled first race, Thompson finished second in the second race. The Norma M30 was only beaten by a Ligier JS P3, raced by Nico Jamin.

In Europe the car competed in the 2017 European Le Mans Series, 2017 Michelin Le Mans Cup and other national series. Erwin Creed and Ricky Capo won the 2017 4 Hours of Monza with the Norma, entered by M.Racing-YMR. In the Michelin Le Mans Cup, a supporting series to the European Le Mans Series, the LMP3 cars were the fastest on track. DKR Engineering, with Jean Glorieux and Alexander Toril, won three straight races. The team won also at Le Mans, Red Bull Ring and Circuit de Spa-Francorchamps.

References

External links
 Norma M30 on the company website

Norma Auto Concept
Le Mans Prototypes